Ilyas is a form of the masculine given name Elias or Elijah.

Notable people with this given name
 Ilyas son of Mudar, ancestor of Muhammad
 Muhammad Ilyas Qadri, Founder of Dawat-e-Islami
 Ilyas Babar (1926-2002), Indian athletic coach
 Ilyas Ahmed (disambiguation), multiple people
 İlyas Demir (born 1985), Turkish martial artist
 Ilyas Gorchkhanov (1967-2005), Russian rebel leader
 Ilyas Gul (born 1968), Pakistani cricketer
 Ilyas Hussain Ibrahim (born 1957), Maldivian politician
 İlyas Kahraman (born 1976), Turkish footballer
 Ilyas Kanchan, Bangladeshi actor
 Ilyas Kashmiri (1964-2011), Pakistani Al-Qaeda operative
 Ilyas Shah Shamsuddin, first Sultan of Bengal
 Ilyas Shurpayev (1975-2008), Russian journalist
 İlyas Şükrüoğlu (born 1966), Turkish freestyle wrestler
 İlyas Tüfekçi (born 1960), Turkish footballer
 Muhammad Ilyas Kandhlawi, founder of Tablighi Jamaat

Notable people with this surname
 Adnan Ilyas (born 1984), Omani cricketer
 Ihab Ilyas (born 1973), Egyptian-Canadian professor
 Muhammad Ilyas (disambiguation), several people

Other uses
 İlyas Bey Mosque, a cultural heritage mosque of Turkey
 İlyas, Burdur, a village in Turkey
Ilyasi Mosque, mosque in Abbottabad, Pakistan

See also
 Islamic view of Elijah

References

Arabic masculine given names
Turkish masculine given names